Scott County is a county located in the U.S. state of Tennessee. Its county seat is Huntsville. Scott County is known for having seceded from Tennessee in protest of the state's decision to join the Confederacy during the Civil War, and subsequently forming The Free and Independent State of Scott.

History
Scott County was formed in 1849 from portions of Anderson, Campbell, Fentress and Morgan counties. It is named for U.S. Army General Winfield Scott, a hero of the Mexican War.

State of Scott

During the Civil War, the county was a Southern Unionist bastion, voting against secession from the Union in Tennessee's June 1861 referendum by a higher percentage (521 to 19, or 96%) than in any other Tennessee county. This sentiment was encouraged by a June 4, 1861, speech in Huntsville by U.S. Senator Andrew Johnson. In 1861, the county assembly officially enacted a resolution seceding from the state of Tennessee, and thus the Confederacy, forming the "Free and Independent State of Scott," also known simply as the "State of Scott." The county remained a pro-Union enclave throughout the war.  Ulysses S. Grant received over 90% of the vote in Scott County during both the 1868 United States presidential election and the 1872 United States presidential election.

The proclamation was finally repealed, over a hundred years later, by Scott County in 1986.

Geography

The county is located in a relatively hilly area atop the Cumberland Plateau. In the southwestern part of the county, the Clear Fork and New River converge to form the Big South Fork of the Cumberland River, a major tributary of the Cumberland River, and the focus of a national river and recreation area.

U.S. Route 27 is the county's primary north–south road.  State Route 63 connects Scott County with Campbell County to the east.  State Route 52 connects Scott County with the Fentress County area to the west.  A portion of State Route 297 connects Oneida with the Big South Fork Recreation Area. State Route 456 is another major road in the area.

Adjacent counties
McCreary County, Kentucky (north)
Campbell County (east)
Anderson County (southeast)
Morgan County (southwest)
Fentress County (west/CST Border)
Pickett County (northwest/CST Border)
Wayne County, Kentucky (northwest)

National protected area
 Big South Fork National River and Recreation Area (part)

State protected areas
 North Cumberland Wildlife Management Area (part)
 Scott State Forest (part)
 Twin Arches State Natural Area (part)

Demographics

1790-1960 1900-19901990-2000 2010-2014
}}

2020 census

As of the 2020 United States census, there were 21,850 people, 8,664 households, and 6,059 families residing in the county.

2000 census
At the 2000 census, there were 21,127 people, 8,203 households and 6,012 families residing in the county. The population density was 40 per square mile (15/km2). There were 8,909 housing units at an average density of 17 per square mile (6/km2). The racial makeup of the county was 98.53% White, 0.09% Black or African American, 0.25% Native American, 0.12% Asian, 0.10% from other races, and 0.91% from two or more races. 0.57% of the population were Hispanic or Latino of any race.

There were 8,203 households, of which 35.70% had children under the age of 18 living with them, 57.20% were married couples living together, 11.80% had a female householder with no husband present, and 26.70% were non-families. 24.30% of all households were made up of individuals, and 9.50% had someone living alone who was 65 years of age or older. The average household size was 2.55 and the average family size was 3.02.

26.10% of the population were under the age of 18, 10.30% from 18 to 24, 28.70% from 25 to 44, 23.60% from 45 to 64, and 11.30% who were 65 years of age or older. The median age was 35 years. For every 100 females there were 97.40 males. For every 100 females age 18 and over, there were 94.00 males.

The median household income was $24,093 and the median family income was $28,595. Males had a median income of $24,721 compared with $19,451 for females. The per capita income for the county was $12,927. About 17.60% of families and 20.20% of the population were below the poverty line, including 24.10% of those under age 18 and 17.10% of those age 65 or over.

Scott County, a part of the Cumberland Plateau, includes the majority of the Big South Fork National River and Recreation Area.

2010 ancestry
As of 2010, the largest self-reported ancestry groups in the county were:
 American - 18.1%
 English - 16.7%
 Irish - 8.4%
 German - 4.2%
 Scots-Irish - 3.2%
 Scottish - 2.0%
 Italian - 1.2%
 Polish - 1.1%

Education
Scott County School District  (Website)
 Burchfield Elementary School; "The Rams"  (Website) 
 Farview Elementary School; "The Rebels"  (Website) 
 Huntsville Elementary School; "The Bears"  (Website) 
 Huntsville Middle School; "The Bears"  (Website)
 Robbins Elementary School; "The Hawks"  (Website)
 Scott High School; "The Highlanders"  (Website) 
 Winfield Elementary School; "The Bobcats"  (Website) 

Oneida Special School District  (Website)
 Oneida Elementary School; "The Indians"  (Website)
 Oneida Middle School; "The Indians"  (Website)
 Oneida High School; "The Indians"  (Website)

Private schools
 Landmark Christian School

Public safety
Includes the Scott County Sheriff Department; Oneida and Winfield Police Department; a full-time ambulance service with two stations; a volunteer rescue squad; and nine volunteer fire stations placed throughout the county.

Media

 The Independent Herald
 The Scott County News
 Hive 105, WBNT-FM

Communities

Towns
 Huntsville (county seat)
 Oneida
 Winfield

Census-designated places
 Elgin
 Helenwood
 Robbins

Unincorporated communities

 Isham
 Montgomery
 New River
 Rugby (partial)
 Winona

Politics

Notable people
Howard Baker Sr.- U.S. Representative for Tennessee's 2nd congressional district.
Howard Baker Jr. - U.S. senator from Tennessee; first Republican elected to the U.S. senate from Tennessee since Reconstruction.

See also
 National Register of Historic Places listings in Scott County, Tennessee

References

External links

 Official website
 Scott County Chamber of Commerce 
 
 Scott Co, TN Genealogy
 Scott county  Landforms

 
1849 establishments in Tennessee
Populated places established in 1849
Counties of Appalachia
East Tennessee